The battle for Brittany took place between August and October 1944. After the Allies broke out of Normandy in June 1944, Brittany became targeted for its well developed ports which the Allies intended to use, whilst also stopping their continued use by German U-boats.

Campaign rationale
Main objective: secure Breton ports which could prove useful to the Allies to land more supplies.

Secondary objective: cease continued use of Breton ports for U-boat operations.

Allied campaign strength
 The US Army's 8th Corps, was tasked to move east to west across the north of Brittany with Brest as their first target.
 At the same time, the US Army's 20th Corps, moved south to the city of Nantes, with both intending to meet up at Lorient.

Once liberated, the Allies planned to build an additional harbour at Quiberon.

One of the first targets in Brittany, was a bridge at Pontaubault across the River Sélune. The Americans apparently quickly started experiencing communication issues with their rear command HQs, due to their rapid advance into northern Brittany, leading to other issues such as supplying the units on the move.

Resistance involvement
The advance of the 8th Corps also brought an additional problem relating to the local resistance. The campaign in Brittany intended the French Resistance to openly fight the Germans. A French Forces of the Interior (FFI) officer based in London, Albert Eon, was flown in to lead an estimated 20,000 local fighters. Equipment was para-dropped in, but due to the rapid American advance, these weapons frequently landed in areas already captured forcing it to be moved up to them. The FFI did have some initial success:
 Attacking and capturing the Vannes airfield using armoured jeeps brought in by gliders.
 Taking rail bridges near Morlaix.

Groups of FFI openly accompanied the Americans, where their local knowledge was used.

Pockets attacked
One assumed reason for the rapid advance of the Americans was that the Germans, had moved most of their forces back to the heavily defended ports, resulting in fewer troops in the interior than expected. These ports had been designated as fortresses to allow for their continued use by the Germans, to deny use by the Allies and finally if necessary to destroy and prevent them from ever being useful to the Allies.

By the time the 20th Corps arrived in Nantes on August 6, its port facilities was in ruins. Also on the 6th, the Americans arrived at the outskirts of Brest, where fighting began and the city finally falling on September 18.

Similar problems were experienced at the pocket of St. Malo, where intelligence from the Resistance indicated a force of 10,000 Germans. The Americans encountered fierce opposition but they gradually advanced to the city's citadel, where the engineered defences meant that 1000-pound bombs were of little use. In desperation, the Americans prepared to drop napalm when the Germans finally surrendered.

The Americans with the FFI faced a similar doggedness at the Brest pocket. Over 75 strong points in the city were attacked, but this proved to be slow-going and time-consuming. By the time of Germany's surrender on September 18, the Americans had lost 10,000 killed and wounded, whilst Brest was destroyed including its port, rendering it useless for Allies purposes.

Stalemate
Rather than risk the same at the Lorient and St. Nazaire pockets, the Americans simply surrounded these ports for the rest of the war, keeping the Germans isolated. Their surrender came at the end of the war. By that time, the need for these port facilities in Brittany had become redundant when the Port of Antwerp was captured.

Post-campaign analysis
This decision to use two armored divisions for the battle of Brittany has been criticised in hindsight, as they could have been used far more profitably in the rapid Allied advance eastward across France. Ironically, after so much effort, German sabotage proved so effective that the liberated Breton ports were unusable for the remainder of the war.

See also
 Battle for Brest
 Saint-Nazaire pocket
 Battle of Saint-Malo

References

Further reading
 Balkoski, Joseph. From Beachhead to Brittany: The 29th Infantry Division at Brest, August-September 1944 (Stackpole books, 2008).
 Balkoski, Joseph. From Brittany to the Reich: The 29th Infantry Division in Germany, September - November 1944 (2012) excerpt
 Bradham, Randolph. To the Last Man: The Battle for Normandy's Cotentin Peninsula and Brittany (Frontline Books, 2008). excerpt
 Ganz, A. Harding. "Questionable Objective: The Brittany Ports, 1944." Journal of Military History 59.1 (1995): 77-95.
 Gawne, Jonathan. The Americans in Brittany, 1944: The Battle for Brest (Histoire & Collections, 2002).
 Irwin, Will. The Jedburghs: The Secret History of the Allied Special Forces, France 1944 (PublicAffairs, 2009).
 Nichols, Major Ralph D. Jedburgh operations: support to the French resistance in eastern Brittany from June-September 1944 (2015). online
 Rosner, Elliot J. The Jedburghs: Combat Operations Conducted in the Finistere Region of Brittany, France from July-September 1944 (Army Command and General Staff College, 1990) online.
 Wood, James A. "Changing Fortunes and the Tyranny of Logistics: Canadian Naval Support of the Brittany Offensive." Global War Studies 9.1 (2012).
 Zaloga, Steven J. Brittany 1944: Hitler’s Final Defenses in France (Bloomsbury Publishing, 2018).

Military history of Brittany
Battles of World War II involving the United States
Battles of World War II involving France
Battles of World War II involving Germany
Conflicts in 1944